Audrey Mittelheisser (born 24 March 1992) is a French badminton player. She started playing badminton at age 9, and in 2010 she joined the France national badminton team. In 2012, she won the French National Badminton Championships in the mixed doubles event with her partner Baptiste Carême. In 2013, she won a silver medal at the Mediterranean Games in the women's doubles event. In 2015, she won a silver medal at the European Games in the mixed doubles event with Gaëtan Mittelheisser.

Achievements

European Games 
Mixed doubles

European Championships 
Mixed doubles

Mediterranean Games 
Women's doubles

BWF International Challenge/Series 
Women's doubles

Mixed doubles

  BWF International Challenge tournament
  BWF International Series tournament
  BWF Future Series tournament

References

External links 
 
 

1992 births
Living people
Sportspeople from Rennes
French female badminton players
Badminton players at the 2015 European Games
European Games silver medalists for France
European Games medalists in badminton
Mediterranean Games silver medalists for France
Competitors at the 2013 Mediterranean Games
Mediterranean Games medalists in badminton
21st-century French women